Sara Diamond may refer to:
Sara Diamond (college president) (born 1954), Canadian artist and former university president
Sara Diamond (singer) (born 1995), Canadian singer/songwriter
Sara Diamond (sociologist) (born 1958), American sociologist and attorney

See also
Sarah E. Diamond (living), American biologist
Diamond (surname)